The Nashya Shaikh or Nashya Sekh is a Muslim community found in northern parts of the state of West Bengal in India. They are culturally and linguistically similar to both people of northern Bangladesh and Goalpara of Assam. A small number of the community are also found in the neighboring state of Bihar, where they are known as the Bengali Shaikh. The group is descended from a set of tribals  which were collectively referred to as Koches, who converted to Islam as they were unable to find a favourable position in Hindu society and came to known as the Rajbanshi Muslims. They are homogeneous with the Koch people and are bi-linguistic speaking both Bengali language and Surjapuri language.

Origin 

The Nashyas trace their origin to the indigenous communities of Koch people of northern West Bengal, though some of them are also from  Mech community. There conversion to Islam is said to have taken over two to three centuries, and the Nashya still retain many cultural traits of their pre-Islamic past.For instance the reverence of pirs was a continuation of their previous beliefs. Most people of the community are non-practicing Muslims though the newer generations are becoming increasing Islamic due to globalization. From historic evidence, it seems a segment of the population of north Bengal converted started to convert to Islam when the region fell under the control of Bakhtiyar Khilji. Some of the earliest converts were the chiefs  Ali Mech and Kala Pahar. Tradition also ascribes the conversion of several lineages to Sufi saints such as Torsa Pir, Pagla Pir, Shah Fakir Sahib and Shah Gari Sahib.

Present circumstances

At the time of the 1891 census in Cooch Behar, the Nasya Sheikh were the predominant Muslims in the state with a population of 1,69,551 while other immigrant Muslim communities were only 1,195. They made up 29.29% of Cooch Behar's population at the time.

Politically the community has remained supportive of the establishment - whether the Raja of Cooch Behar, the Congress during Partition, or the Left Front and Trinamool Congress during their time in power.

The Nashya were at one time substantial landowners, generally known as jotedars. Below this class was a substantial strata of medium-sized peasants. With the independence of India in 1947, the larger estates were broken up. The community's contribution to the agriculture of northern West Bengal is substantial, with the Nashya growing jute, tobacco, and rice.

The Nashya as a community were once strictly endogamous but their marriage with mainstream Bengali Muslims brought them more close to Bengali culture. Their physical appearance seems to be more similar to Bengalis rather than Rajbongshi people. They are divided into lineages such as Bepari, Pramanik, Sarcar and Sekh. Each of these lineage groups intermarry. The community is mainly follows hanafi school of Sunni Islam. They concentrated in the districts of Cooch Behar, Jalpaiguri, Darjeeling, Dinajpur (north and south). They are also found in the neighbouring Purnia Division of Behar, where they are known as Bengali Shaikh.

The community have set up their own political and cultural organization, the Uttar Bango Angrassar Muslim Sangram Samiti, which acts as pressure group for this community.

See also

 Rajbanshi people
 Bengali Muslims
 Shaikh of Bihar
 Punjabi Shaikh
 Shaikhs in South Asia

Notes

References
 

Social groups of West Bengal
Muslim communities of India
Shaikh clans